John Leland may refer to:

John Leland (antiquary) (c. 1503–1552), English antiquary
John Leland (Baptist) (1754–1841), United States Baptist minister
John Leland (journalist) (born 1959), New York Times reporter, columnist, and book author
John Leland (politician) (died 1808), British Army general and English Member of Parliament for Stamford, 1796–1808
John Leland (Presbyterian) (1691–1766), English Presbyterian minister
John E. Leland, American engineer and Director of the University of Dayton Research Institute

See also
John Leland Atwood (1904–1999), American aerospace engineer
John Leland Center for Theological Studies in Virginia, United States
John Leland Champe (1895–1978), American archaeologist